The 2007–08 season was St Mirren's second consecutive season in the Scottish Premier League, and they were looking to improve on last season's 11th placing ahead of Dunfermline.

They also competed in the Scottish League Cup and the Scottish Cup, however were the subject of a shock defeat in the League Cup by 3rd Division East Fife.

They were knocked out in the 6th Round of the Scottish Cup by First Division side St Johnstone.
The Buddies began 2008 much more positively than 2007 where they won only 2 home games. By 19 January, they had broken this record by winning 3 games in a row.

Transfers
In:

Out:

Players

Squad

Fixtures and results
Fixtures and results for St Mirren F.C. for season 2007–08.

NOTE: scores are written St Mirren first

Competitions

SPL

Classification

See also
List of St Mirren F.C. seasons

References

2007-08
Saint Mirren